This is a list of territorial governors in the 16th century (1501–1600) AD, such as the administrators of colonies, protectorates, or other dependencies. Where applicable, native rulers are also listed.

A dependent territory is normally a territory that does not possess full political independence or sovereignty as a sovereign state yet remains politically outside of the controlling state's integral area. The administrators of uninhabited territories are excluded.

England
Kingdom of England English overseas possessions
Monarchs

British Isles

Guernsey, Crown dependency
British monarchs are the Dukes of Normandy
Governors
Edward Weston, Governor (1486–1509)
Richard Weston, Governor (1509–1541)
Francis Weston, co-Governor (1533–1536)
Richard Long, Governor (1541–1545)
Peter Mewtis, Governor (1545–1553)
Leonard Chamberlain, Governor (1553–1561)
Francis Chamberlain, Governor (1561–1570)
Thomas Leighton, Governor (1570–1609)
Bailiffs
John Martin, Bailiff (1499–1510)
James Guille, Bailiff (1511–1537)
Thomas Compton, Bailiff (1538–1544)
John Haryvell, Bailiff (1545–1549)
Hellier Gosselin, Bailiff (1549–1562)
Thomas Compton, Bailiff (1562–1570)
Guillaume de Beauvoir, Bailiff (1571–1581)
Thomas Wigmore, Bailiff (1581–1588)
Louis de Vic, Bailiff (1588–1600)

Lordship of Ireland, a papal fief of England 
English monarchs are the Lords of Ireland
Lord Deputy of Ireland
Gerald FitzGerald, 8th Earl of Kildare (1496–1513)
Gerald FitzGerald, 9th Earl of Kildare (1513–1518)
Sir Maurice Fitzgerald 
Thomas Howard, Earl of Surrey (1520–1522)
Piers Butler, 8th Earl of Ormonde (1522–1524)
Gerald FitzGerald, 9th Earl of Kildare (1524–1529)
Sir William Skeffington (1529–1532)
Gerald FitzGerald, 9th Earl of Kildare (1532–1534)
Sir William Skeffington (1534–1535)
Leonard Grey, 1st Viscount Grane (1536–1540)

Kingdom of Ireland, effectively a client state of England
English monarchs are the Monarchs of Ireland
Lord Deputy of Ireland
Anthony St Leger (1540–1548)
Edward Bellingham (1548–1549)
Lord Justices (1549–1550)
Anthony St Leger (1550–1551)
James Croft (1551–1552)
Lord Justices (1552–1553)
Anthony St Leger (1553–1556)
Thomas Radclyffe, 3rd Earl of Sussex (1556–1558) (Lord Lieutenant 1560–1564)
Sir Nicholas Arnold(1564–1565)
Sir Henry Sidney (1565–1571) (1575–1578)
William FitzWilliam (1571–1575)  (1588–1594)
Arthur Grey, 14th Baron Grey de Wilton (1580–1582)
Sir John Perrot (1584–1588)
William Russell, 1st Baron Russell of Thornhaugh (1594–1597)
Thomas Burgh, 7th Baron Strabolgi (1597)
Robert Devereux, 2nd Earl of Essex (Lord Lieutenant of Ireland 1599)

North America

Roanoke Colony
Governors
Walter Raleigh, Lord and Governor (1585–c.1590)
Ralph Lane, Acting Governor (1585–1586)
John White, Acting Governor (1587)

France
Ancien Régime of France French colonial empire
Heads of state

North America

New France
Lieutenant generals
Jean-François Roberval, Lieutenant general (1541–1543)
vacant (1543–1598)
Marquis de la Roche-Mesgouez, Lieutenant general (1598–1603)

Portugal
Kingdom of Portugal Portuguese colonial empire
Monarchs

Africa
Portuguese Angola
Governors
Paulo Dias de Novais, Donatario (1575–1589)
Luís Serrão, Governor (1589–1591)
André Ferreira Pereira, Governor (1591–1592)
Francisco de Almeida, Governor (1592–1593)
Jerónimo de Almeida, Governor (1593–1594)
João Furtado de Mendonça, Governor (1594–1602)

Portuguese Cape Verde
Santiago	
Rodrigo Afonso, Captains (1473–1505)
Ribeira Grande	
Captains
Sebastião Álvares de Landim, Captain (1508–?)
Fernão Mendes, Captain (1515–c.1516)
João Alemão, Captain (1517–?)
João Correia de Souza, Captain (1536–?)
António Correia de Souza, Captain (1544–?)
Manuel de Andrade, Captain (1555–?)
Constantino de Bragança, Captain (1562–?)
Boa Vista	
Captains
Rodrigo Afonso, Captain (1497–1505)
Pêro Correia, Captain (1505–?)
António Correia, Captain (?–1542)
Maria Correia, Captain (1542–?)
Alcatrazes Islands	
Captains
Afonso Ribeiro, Captain (1504–?)
Rodrigi Varela, Captain (1508–?)
Praia	
Captains
André Rodrigues dos Mosquitos, Captain (1526–1527)
Gomes Balieiro, Captain (1527–?)
Manuel Correia, Captain (1570–?)
Fogo	
Captains
João de Meneses Vasconcellos, conde de Penela, Captain (1528–1529)
Afonso de Meneses, conde de Penela, Captain (1528–?)
Sal, Santa Luzia and Brava
Captains
Luís Pereira, Captain (1542–?)
Martinho Pereira, Captain (1553–?)
Santo Antão	
Gonçalo de Sousa, Captains (1548–?)
Governors of Cape Verde
Pêro de Guimarães, Corregedor (?–1517)
João Alemão, Corregedor (1517–1521)
Leonis Correia, Corregedor (1521–1527)
Gaspar Correia, Corregedor (1527–1534)
Estêvão de Lagos, Corregedor (1534–1536)
André Feio, Corregedor (1536–1541)
Simão Afonso, Corregedor (1539–1541)
Pêro Moniz, Corregedor (1541–1544)
António Ferreira, Corregedor (1544–1547)
Pêro de Araujo, Corregedor (1547–1550)
Jorge Pimentel, Corregedor (1550–1556)
Manuel de Andrade, Corregedor (1556–1559)
Luís Martins de Evangelho, Corregedor (1559–1560)
Gregório Martins Caminha, Corregedor (1560–1562)
Bernardo de Alpoim, Corregedor (1562–1571)
António Velho Tinoco, Corregedor (1571–1577)
Cristóvão Soares de Mello, Corregedor (1577–1579)
Diogo Dias Magro, Corregedor (1579–1584)
Gaspar de Andrade, Corregedor (1584–1588)
Amador Gomes Raposo, Corregedor (1588–1588)
Duarte Lobo da Gama, Governor (1588–1591)
Brás Soares de Melo, Governor (1591–1595)
Fancisco Lobo da Gama, Governor (1597–1603)

Portuguese São Tomé
Captains, Governors
Fernão de Melo, Captain (1499–c.1510)
unspecified (c.1510–c.1516)
Diogo de Alcáçova, Captain (c.1516–c.1517)
João de Melo, Captain (c.1517–1522)
Vasco Estevens, Captain (1522–?)
unspecified (?–1531)
Henrique Pereira, Captain (1531–c.1535)
unspecified (c.1535–1541)
Diogo Botelho Pereira, Captain (1541–1545)
Francisco de Barros de Paiva, Captain (1546–c.1554)
Pedro Botelho, Captain (c.1558–?)
unspecified (?–1560)
Cristóvão Dória de Sousa, Captain (1560–1564)
Francisco de Gouveia, Captain (1564–1569)
Francisco de Pavia Teles, Captain (1569–1571)
Diogo Salema, Captain (1571–1575)
António Monteiro Maciel, Captain (1575–c.1582)
unspecified (c.1582–c.1584)
Francisco Fernandes de Figueiredo, Captain (c.1584–1586), Governor (1586–1587)
Miguel Teles de Moura, Governor (1587–1591)
Duarte Peixoto da Silva, Governor (1591–1592)
Francisco de Vila Nova, Acting Governor (1592–1593)
Fernandes de Meneses, Governor (1593–1597)
Vasco de Carvalho, Governor (1597–c.1598)
João Barbosa da Cunha, Acting Governor (c.1598–1601)

Portuguese Moçambique
Captains major, Captains general

Captaincy of Sofala under Viceroy of India
Sancho de Tovar, Captain major (1501–1505)
Pêro de Anaia, Captain major (1505–1506)
Manuel Fernandes de Meireles, Acting Captain major (1506)
Nuno Vaz Pereira, Captain major (1506–1507)
Captaincy of Sofala and Moçambique under Viceroy of India
Vasco Gomes de Abreu, Captain major (1507–1508)
Rui de Brito Patalim, Acting Captain major (1508–1509)
António de Saldanha, Captain major (1509–1512)
Simão de Miranda de Azevedo, Captain major (1512–1515)
Sancho de Tovar, Acting Captain major (1512–1515)
Cristóvão de Távora, Captain major (1515–1518)
Sancho de Tovar, Captain major (1518–1521)
Diogo de Sepúlveda, Captain major (1521–1525)
Lopo de Almeida, Captain major (1525–1528)
António da Silveira de Meneses, Captain major (1528–1531)
Vicente Pegado, Captain major (1531–1538)
Alexio Chicorro, Captain major (1538–1541)
João de Sepúlveda, Captain major (1541–1548)
Fernão de Sousa de Távora, Captain major (1548–1551)
Diogo de Mesquita, Captain major (1551–1553)
Diogo de Sousa, Captain major (1553–1557)
Sebastião de Sá, Captain major (1557–1560)
Pantaleão de Sá, Captain major (1560–1564)
Jerónimo Barreto, Captain major (1564–1567)
Pedro Barreto Rolim, Captain major (1567–1569)
Captaincy-general of Moçambique
Francisco Barreto, Captain general (1569–1573)
Vasco Fernandes Homem, Acting Captain general (1573–1577)
Fernando Monroi, Acting Captain general (1577)
Simão de Silveira, Acting Captain general (1577)
Pedro de Castro, Captain general (1577–1582)
Nuno Pereira, Captain general (1582–1586)
Jorge Telo de Meneses, Captain general (1586–1589)
Lourenço de Brito, Captain general (1589–1590)
Pedro de Sousa, Captain general (1590–1595)
Nuno da Cunha Ataíde, Captain general (1595–1598)
Álvaro Abranches, Captain general (1598–1601)

Portuguese Tangier
Governors
Lopo Vaz de Azevedo, Governor (1490?–1501)
João de Meneses, Governor (1501–1508)
Duarte de Meneses, Governor (1508–1521)
Henrique de Meneses, Governor (1521–1522)
Duarte de Meneses, from Évora, Governor (1522–1533)
Gonçalo Mendes Sacoto, Governor (1533–1536)
Duarte de Meneses, Governor (1536–1539)
João de Meneses, Governor (1539–1546)
Francisco Botelho, Governor (1546–1548)
Pedro de Meneses, Governor (1548–1550)
João Álvares de Azevedo, Governor (1550–1552)
Luís de Loureiro, Governor (1552–1553)
Fernando de Menezes, Governor (1553)
Luís da Silva de Meneses, Governor (1553–1554)
Bernardim de Carvalho, Governor (1554–1564)
Lourenço de Távora, Governor (1564–1566)
João de Meneses, Governor (1566–1572)
Rui de Carvalho, Governor (1572–1573)
Diogo Lopes da Franca, Governor (1573–1574)
António of Portugal, Governor (1574)
Duarte de Meneses, Viceroy of Portuguese India, Governor (1574–1578)
Pedro da Silva, Governor (1578)
Jorge de Mendonça, Governor (1578–1581)
Francisco de Almeida, Governor (1581–1590)
Belchior da França, Simão Lopes de Mendonça, Governor (1590–1591)
Aires de Saldanha, Governor (1591–1599)
António Pereira Lopes de Berredo, Governor (1599–1605)

Asia
Portuguese India

South America
Colonial Brazil
Governors general
Tomé de Sousa, Governor general (1549–1553)
Duarte da Costa, Governor general (1553-1558)
Mem de Sá, Governor general (1558-1572)
Luís de Brito de Almeida, Governor general (1573-1578, Bahia)
Cristóvão de Barros, Governor general (1572-1574, Rio de Janeiro)
Lourenço da Veiga, Governor general (1578-1581)
António Barreiros, Interim Governor general (1581-1583)
Manuel Teles Barreto, Governor general (1583-1587)
António Barreiros, Interim Governor general (1587-1591)
D. Francisco de Sousa, Governor general (1591-1602)

Spain
Habsburg Spain Spanish colonial empire
Monarchs

Caribbean
Colony of Santiago
Governors
Juan de Esquivel, Governor (1510–1514)
Francisco de Garay, Governor (1514–1523)
Pedro de Mazuelo, Governor (1523–1526)
Juan de Mendegurren, Governor (1526–1527)
Santino de Raza, Governor (1527–1531)
Gonzalo de Guzman, Governor (?–1532)
Manuel de Rojas, Governor (1532–?)
Gil González Dávila, Governor (1533?–1534?)
Manuel de Rojas, Governor (1536–?)
Pedro Cano, Governor (1539?)
Francisco de Pina, Governor (1544?)
Juan González de Hinojosa, Governor (1556?)
Pedro Cano, Governor (1558?)
Blas de Melo, Governor (1565?)
Juan de Gaudiel, Governor (1567?–1572?)
Hernán Manrique de Rojas, Governor (1575?)
Iñigo Fuentes, Governor (?–1577)
Rodrigo Núñez de la Peña, Governor (1577–1578)
Lucas del Valle Alvarado, Governor (1578–1583?)
Diego Fernández de Mercado, Governor (1586?)
Lucas del Valle Alvarado, Governor (1591?)
García del Valle, Governor (1596?)
Fernando Melgarejo Córdoba, Governor (1596–1606)

Europe
Spanish Netherlands
Governors
Engelbert II of Nassau, Governor (1501-1504)
William de Croÿ, Governor (1504-1507)
Margaret of Austria, Governor (1507-1530)
Mary of Austria, Governor (1531-1555)
Emmanuel Philibert of Savoy, Governor (1555-1559)
Margaret of Parma, Governor (1559-1567)
Fernando Álvarez de Toledo, Governor (1567-1573)
Luis de Requesens y Zúñiga, Governor (1573-1576)
John of Austria, Governor (1576-1578)
Alexander Farnese, Governor (1578-1592)
Peter Ernst I von Mansfeld-Vorderort, Governor (1592-1594)
Ernest of Austria, Governor (1594-1595)
Pedro Henriquez de Acevedo, Governor (1595-1596)
Albert of Austria, Governor (1596-1598)

North America
Azcapotzalco part of the Triple Alliance of the Aztec Empire (1428-1521)
Don Carlos Oquiztzin, Tlatoani (English: "Ruler" or "King") (1499-1520?)
Cuauhnahuac dependency of Aztec Empire (1403=1520)
Tehuehuetzin, Tlatoani (ruler or governor) (before 1491-1504)
Itzohuatzin (or Yoatzin), Tlatoani (?-1520)
Ecatepec 
Part of the Triple Alliance of the Aztec Empire (1428-1521)
Chimalpilli II, 4th Tlatoani (1498-1520)
Dependency of New Spain (1521-1547)
Diego de Alvarado Huanitzin, 5th Tlatoani (1520–1539) 
Don Diego Quauhpotonqui, 6th Tlatoani (1539-1547)

New Spain complete list —
Governor of the West Indies
Diego Velázquez de Cuéllar, governor-general of Cuba (1518–1524)
Governors of New Spain
Hernán Cortés, governor and captain-general (1521, 1521–1524, 1526)
Cristóbal de Tapia, governor (1521)
Alonso de Estrada, Rodrigo de Albornoz, Alonso de Zuazo, Triumvirate (1524)
Gonzalo de Salazar, Pedro Almíndez Chirino, Alonso de Zuazo, Triumvirate (1524–1525)
Gonzalo de Salazar, Pedro Almíndez Chirino, Alonso de Estrada, Rodrigo de Albornoz, Alonso de Zuazo, Triumvirate (1525)
Gonzalo de Salazar, Pedro Almíndez Chirino, Alonso de Zuazo, Triumvirate (1525)
Gonzalo de Salazar, Pedro Almíndez Chirino, Triumvirate (1525–1526)
Alonso de Estrada, Rodrigo de Albornoz, Triumvirate (1526)
Luis Ponce de León, Triumvirate (1526)
Marcos de Aguilar, Governor (1526–1527)
Alonso de Estrada, Gonzalo de Sandoval, Luis de la Torre, Triumvirate (1527)
Alonso de Estrada, Luis de la Torre, Triumvirate (1527–1528)
Nuño Beltrán de Guzmán, Juan Ortiz de Matienzo, Diego Delgadillo, Triumvirate (1528–1529)
Juan Ortiz de Matienzo, Diego Delgadillo, Triumvirate (1529–1531)
Sebastián Ramírez de Fuenleal, Vasco de Quiroga, Juan de Salmerón, Alonso de Maldonado, Francisco Ceinos, Triumvirate (1531–1535)
Viceroys
Antonio de Mendoza, Viceroy (1535–1550)
Luís de Velasco, Viceroy (1550–1564)
Gastón de Peralta, Viceroy (1566–1567)
Alonso Muñoz and Luis Carrillo, Viceroys (1567–1568)
Martín Enríquez de Almanza, Viceroy (1568–1580)
Lorenzo Suárez de Mendoza, Viceroy (1580–1583)
Pedro Moya de Contreras, Viceroy (1584–1585)
Álvaro Manrique de Zúñiga, Viceroy (1585–1590)
Luis de Velasco, Viceroy (1590–1595, 1607–1611)
Gaspar de Zúñiga, Viceroy (1595–1603)

Tenochtitlan (dependency of New Spain)
Juan Velázquez Tlacotzin, 13th Tlatoani (1525-1526)
Andrés de Tapia Motelchiuh, 14th Tlatoani (1525–1530)
Pablo Xochiquentzin, Cuauhtlatoani (Eagle Captain) (1536)
Diego de Alvarado Huanitzin, 15th Tlatoani of Mexico-Tenochtitlan and 1st governor of San Juan Tenochtitlan (1539–1541)
Diego de San Francisco Tehuetzquititzin, 16th Tlatoani of Mexico-Tenochtitlan and 2nd governor of San Juan Tenochtitlan (1541-1554)
Esteban de Guzmán, judge of San Juan Tenochtitlan (1554-1557)
Cristóbal de Guzmán Cecetzin, 17th Tlatoani of Mexico-Tenochtitlan and 3rd governor of San Juan Tenochtitlan (1557-1562)
Luis de Santa María Nanacacipactzin, 18th Tlatoani of Mexico-Tenochtitlan and 4th governor of San Juan Tenochtitlan (1563–1565)

South America
Governorate of New Castile
Governors
Francisco Pizarro, Governor (1528–1541)
Cristóbal Vaca de Castro, Governor (1541–1544)
Gonzalo Pizarro, usurper Governor (1544–1548)

Viceroyalty of Peru
Viceroys
Blasco Núñez Vela, Viceroy (1544–1546)
Pedro de la Gasca, Viceroy (1546–1549)
Antonio de Mendoza, Viceroy (1550–1551)
Melchor Bravo de Saravia, Viceroy (1552–1556)
Andrés Hurtado de Mendoza, Viceroy (1556–1561)
Diego López de Zúñiga, Viceroy (1561–1564)
Juan de Saavedra, Viceroy (1564)
Lope García de Castro, Viceroy (1564–1569)
Francisco de Toledo, Viceroy (1569-1581)
Martín Enríquez de Almanza, Viceroy (1581–1583)
Cristóbal Ramírez de Cartagena, Viceroy (1584)
Fernando Torres de Portugal y Mesía, Viceroy (1584–1589)
García Hurtado de Mendoza, Viceroy (1590–1596)
Luis de Velasco, Viceroy (1596–1604)

References

Territorial governors
-16th century
Territorial governors
 Territorial governors